Close to Me may refer to:

 "Close to Me" (The Cure song), 1985
 "Close to Me" (G-Unit song), 2008
 "Close to Me" (Ellie Goulding, Diplo and Swae Lee song), 2018
 "Close to Me", a 2008 song by The Summer Set from ...In Color
 "Close to Me", a 2018 song by Isaiah Firebrace
 "Close to Me", a 2011 song by Sabrepulse
 Close to Me (TV series), 2021 British miniseries starring Connie Nielsen
 "Close to Me", a 2021 song by Blackswan

See also
 Close to You (disambiguation)
 "Closer to Me", 2001 song by Five
 "Don't Stand So Close to Me", 1980 song by the Police